Brigadier Sir Charles Alfred Howard, GCVO, DSO* (1878–1958) was a British parliamentary official and army officer. He served as Serjeant-at-Arms of the House of Commons from 1935 to 1956.

Early life 
Born on 29 July 1878, Howard was a member of the prominent Howard family. He was the son of the Hon. Greville Theophilus Howard (1836–1880; a younger son of Charles Howard, 17th Earl of Suffolk) and Lady Audrey Jane Charlotte (died 1926), daughter of John Townshend, 4th Marquess Townshend. Howard's sister Joyce was married to Sir Arthur Doyle, 4th Baronet. His half-sister from his mother's second marriage to General Sir Redvers Henry Buller was Dame Georgiana Buller, DBE, RRC.

Career 
After schooling at Eton College, Howard attended the Royal Military College, Sandhurst, and joined the Army in 1898. He was posted in India until 1899 and then, from 1900, in South Africa where he was an aide-de-camp to his stepfather during the Second Boer War. From 1912 to 1916, Howard was a staff officer. He served in the First World War; from 1916, he commanded the 16th King's Royal Rifles, was injured and received the Distinguished Service Order in 1917 and received a bar to the DSO in 1918. He was promoted to Colonel in 1923 and from 1929 to 1932 he commanded the 162nd (East Midland) Brigade; from 1932 to 1935, he then commanded the 12th Infantry Brigade and Dover Garrison, and received the freedom of the Borough of Dover on relinquishing his command. He retired from the Army in 1936 and was promoted to the honorary rank of Brigadier.

In 1935, George V appointed Howard to the office of Serjeant-at-Arms of the House of Commons, which had previously been held by Admiral Sir Colin Keppel. Howard built a reputation for upholding traditions and was well-regarded for having a "genial personality". He was appointed a Knight Commander of the Royal Victorian Order in 1944 and promoted to Knight Grand Cross in 1957, the year after he retired from his office.

Retirement and personal life 
Howard died on 5 January 1958. In 1908, he had married Miriam Eleanore Dansey, daughter of Lieutenant-Colonel Edward Mashiter Dansey and his wife the Hon. Eleanor Gifford, daughter of Robert Gifford, 2nd Baron Gifford; she died in 1969. They had two children, a daughter Diana who died young, and a son Henry Redvers Greville Howard (1911–1978), an army officer and the father of Greville Howard, Baron Howard of Rising.

Likenesses 
The National Portrait Gallery, London, possesses five photographic portraits of Howard taken between 1935 and 1947, all by Walter Stoneman (NPG x7671, x4671, x163250, x188930, x188931).

References

Notes

Citations 

1878 births
1958 deaths
British Army brigadiers
Serjeants-at-Arms of the British House of Commons
Knights Grand Cross of the Royal Victorian Order
British Army personnel of World War I
King's Royal Rifle Corps officers
Graduates of the Royal Military College, Sandhurst
People educated at Eton College
British Army personnel of the Second Boer War
Companions of the Distinguished Service Order
Howard family (English aristocracy)